Sir Samuel Roberts, 2nd Baronet JP (2 September 1882 – 13 December 1955) was a British politician.

Son of the Sheffield Ecclesall MP Samuel Roberts, Roberts grew up at Queen's Tower in Norfolk Park, Sheffield.  He attended Harrow School and Trinity College, Cambridge before becoming a solicitor.

In 1913, Roberts became a Justice of the Peace, and in 1919, the Lord Mayor of Sheffield.  In 1921, he was elected as the Conservative Party MP for Hereford, and at the 1929 general election he switched to represent his father's former constituency of Sheffield Ecclesall.  He stood down at the 1935 general election, serving that year as the Master Cutler.

References

Michael Stenton and Stephen Lees, Who's Who of British MPs: Volume III, 1919-1945

External links 
 

1882 births
1955 deaths
Alumni of Trinity College, Cambridge
Baronets in the Baronetage of the United Kingdom
Conservative Party (UK) MPs for English constituencies
Lord Mayors of Sheffield
People educated at Harrow School
UK MPs 1918–1922
UK MPs 1922–1923
UK MPs 1923–1924
UK MPs 1924–1929
UK MPs 1929–1931
UK MPs 1931–1935
Master Cutlers
Politicians from Sheffield
20th-century English businesspeople